US Post Office-Oneida is a historic post office building located at Oneida in Madison County, New York, United States. It was designed and built in 1931, and is one of a number of post offices in New York State designed by the Office of the Supervising Architect of the Treasury Department, James A. Wetmore.  It is a one-story, seven bay wide building in the Colonial Revival style.  The five central bays are faced with limestone and limestone trim appears throughout the design.

It was listed on the National Register of Historic Places in 1988.

References

Oneida
Government buildings completed in 1931
Colonial Revival architecture in New York (state)
National Register of Historic Places in Madison County, New York